Nerio Rojas (March 7, 1890 – 1971) was an Argentine physician who authored more than three hundred works on forensic medicine.

Works
Legal Medicine (1936 and 1942). a treaty that has long been used in university education;
Non-actuality of Bergsonism?: International symposium. In collaboration with several authors. Chapter: "From Bergson to Freud", pages 339 to 348.
Psychiatry in civil law: comments on the Civil Code and the reform bill (1938).
Hunger: study medical, legal and social (1946).
Medicolegal Decalogue.
Sarmiento Psychology’' (1916).Compendium of Legal Medicine (1918).Injuries. Medical-legal study (1926).The spirit of physician training (1928).The venereal contagion in forensic medicine (1937), award-winning work by the Faculty of Medical Sciences with the award "Eduardo Perez". In collaboration with Frederick Bonnet.Legal Medicine and job security (1940)
’'Biology of Freedom (1958).

References 

20th-century Argentine physicians
1890 births
1971 deaths